Rashash (Arabic: رشاش) is an eight-part Saudi Arabian drama series written by Tony Jordan, Sheikha Suha Al Khalifa and Richard Bellamy and directed by Colin Teague. The series follows the true-life story of Rashash Al-Otaibi, a Saudi bandit, drug trafficker and murderer who terrorized the local population in the 1970s and 1980s.

The multi-million dollar crime-thriller production was shot partly in Saudi Arabia and partly in Abu Dhabi and features an all-Saudi cast in the lead roles. The script tapped exclusive material Saudi state archives on the real Rashash's "long-running criminal investigation from the late 1980s.”

It was streamed on Shahid VIP with one episode per week of about an hour, starting from July 9, 2021.

References 

Saudi Arabian television series
2021 television series debuts
Arabic-language television shows